Eino Lahti (18 May 1915 – 13 October 2003) was a Finnish footballer. He competed in the men's tournament at the 1936 Summer Olympics. At club level he played for Helsingin Palloseura, Vaasan Palloseura and RU-38. In Mestaruussarja he played a total of 88 games scoring once, 41 games and 1 goal for VPS and 47 games for HPS. He also played in second division.

References

External links
 

1915 births
2003 deaths
Finnish footballers
Finland international footballers
Olympic footballers of Finland
Footballers at the 1936 Summer Olympics
Sportspeople from Vaasa
Association football midfielders